Lawrence Amos McLouth, A.B., LL.D. (1863–1927) was an American Germanic scholar, born at Ontonagon, Michigan He graduated from the University of Michigan in 1887, as a member of the Zeta Psi fraternity. He served as principal of the Danville, Illinois High School for three years, then proceeded to Europe for additional training, studying for two years at Leipzig, Heidelberg, and Munich. He returned to the University of Michigan as instructor in German. In 1895 he became professor of Germanic languages and literatures at New York University. He edited Huldrych Zwingli's sermons (1902) and some of the novels of Friedrich Gerstäcker (1904) and Paul Johann Ludwig von Heyse (1910). He published The Teaching of Foreign Literature (1903) and Verses (1910).

American book editors
American translators
1863 births
1927 deaths
University of Michigan alumni
University of Michigan faculty